Athrostictus is a genus of ground beetles in the family Carabidae.

Species
These 18 species belong to the genus Athrostictus:

 Athrostictus chlaenioides (Dejean, 1829) c g
 Athrostictus circumfusus (Putzeys, 1878) c g
 Athrostictus gilvipes van Emden, 1935 c g
 Athrostictus iridescens Chaudoir, 1843 
 Athrostictus luctuosus (Reiche, 1843) c g
 Athrostictus luridus (Reiche, 1843) c g
 Athrostictus magus (Boheman, 1858) c g
 Athrostictus metallicus (Reiche, 1843) c g
 Athrostictus nobilis (Brullé, 1838) c g
 Athrostictus opalescens Bates, 1878 c g
 Athrostictus paganus (Dejean, 1831) c g
 Athrostictus puberulus (Dejean, 1829) c g
 Athrostictus pubipennis (Boheman, 1858) c g
 Athrostictus punctatulus (Putzeys, 1878) i c g b
 Athrostictus rufilabris (Dejean, 1829) c g
 Athrostictus sericatus Bates, 1878 c g
 Athrostictus sulcatulus (Dejean, 1829) c g
 Athrostictus velutinus (Putzeys, 1878) c g
 Athrostictus vicinus (Gory, 1833) c g

Data sources: i = ITIS, c = Catalogue of Life, g = GBIF, b = Bugguide.net

References

Harpalinae